Arthur Carr Ellis (born July 26, 1961) is a Democratic member of the Maryland Senate from the 28th district in Charles County.

Current assignments

Senator Ellis was first elected to the Maryland Senate in 2018 and has been a member of the Senate since January 9, 2019. He is currently a standing member of the Maryland General Assembly's Education, Health & Environmental (EHE) Affairs Committee, the Health and Education Subcommittee of the EHE committee, the Joint Committee on Ending Homelessness and the Joint Subcommittee on Program Open Space & Agricultural Land Preservation. In addition to his duties on the Democratic Caucus, the Maryland Legislative Black Caucus and the executive committee of Veterans Caucus, Senator Ellis was promoted to serve as Assistant Deputy Majority Leader in the Senate during the 2020 Legislative Session.

Senator Ellis is a consistent leader in the Charles County 4-H Youth program. The program grants educational opportunities for children in partnership with the U.S. Department of Agriculture. Within 4-H, the Senator guided a team in creating two of the program's most popular initiatives: the robotics club and the "Learn-To-Swim" classes. 4-H's motto of "Learn by Doing" has inspired his approach to public service.

The Charles County NAACP Branch inducted Senator Ellis into their Hall of Fame for his commitment, leadership and dedication to the community of Charles County in the fight for justice and civil rights. He continues to bring the values of equality, acceptance and tolerance to the Maryland Senate.

The Meyerhoff Scholars Program at the University of Maryland Baltimore County seeks to increase diversity among future leaders of science. As a former president of the Meyerhoff parents Association, Senator Ellis served fully committed to the next generation. His son, Myles, is  a Meyerhoff graduate and currently pursuing his graduate studies at Harvard University.

After graduating from the University of Maryland College Park in 1983, Senator Ellis served as an officer in the United States Air Force. Due to injuries sustained while in the Air Force, he prematurely returned to civilian life and later earned his master's degree in accountancy from The City University of New York. He is currently a Certified Public Accountant, or CPA.

2020 session 
 Notable Legislation Sponsored By Senator Ellis that Passed During the 2020 Session of the Maryland General Assembly.

Important Documents and Identification Cards - Inmates (SB 77)

Requires motor vehicle departments to issue state identification cards to inmates who were released from jail/prison, including those still in custody, so that they are known entities. This initiative derives from a criminal justice reform meeting with U.S. Congressman Steny Hoyer. Without having a state ID upon their release, these individuals are more likely to face barriers that would impede their transition back into society. SB 77 is a no-brainer law that assures a state ID is essential for procuring housing, employment and utilizing most forms of transportation.

Higher Education - Annual Revenues of For-Profit Institutions - Limitation on Enrollment: Veterans' Education Protection Act (SB 294)

Prohibits certain for-profit institutions of higher education and private career schools from enrolling new Maryland residents if, beginning in fiscal year 2023, federal funds exceed 10% of annual revenues; requires the Maryland Higher Education Commission to adopt certain regulations by December 1, 2020; etc.

Southern Maryland - Homeowners Association Commission - Alternative Dispute Resolution Authority (SB 428)

Expands the authority of certain homeowners association commissions in the code home rule counties of the Southern Maryland class to hear and resolve through alternative dispute resolution certain issues between a homeowners association and a homeowner regarding certain governing documents, including declarations, bylaws, deeds, and recorded covenants and restrictions.

Charles County - Illegal Disposal of Bulky Items - Penalties (SB 429)

Authorizes the governing body of Charles County to adopt an ordinance to prohibit the disposal of a bulky item on a highway or on public or private property except under certain circumstances; and authorizes Charles County to impose certain penalties of imprisonment not exceeding 30 days or a fine not exceeding $5,000 or both for certain violations.

Southern Maryland Code Counties - Collective Bargaining (SB 430)

Authorizes a Southern Maryland code county to enact a local law that provides certain employees with certain collective bargaining rights; requires a certain local law to provide definitions of and remedies for unfair labor practices and prohibit certain strikes or work stoppages by certain employees; provides that "regular employee" does not include an appointed or elected official, or a supervisory, managerial, or confidential employee; etc.

Charles County - Tax Increment Financing and Special Taxing Districts (SB 431)

Authorizes Charles County to use the proceeds from the issuance of certain tax increment financing bonds for convention centers, conference centers, or visitor's centers, to maintain infrastructure improvements at the centers, and to market development districts facilities and other improvements in the Waldorf Urban Redevelopment Corridor; and authorizes Charles County to establish a special taxing district, impose ad valorem or special taxes, and issue bonds to provide financing, refinancing, or reimbursement for certain costs.

Tri-County Council for Southern Maryland - Funding (SB 805)

Increasing, to $125,000, the amount of money that the county commissioners of Calvert County, Charles County, and St. Mary's County are required to appropriate each year for the Tri-County Council for Southern Maryland to foster cooperative planning and development in the region.

 Charles County Bond Initiatives Sponsored by Senator Ellis and Funding Awarded

LifeStyles Homeless Services Center - GRANTED; $200,000 FROM THE SENATE

Located in Southern Maryland, LifeStyles of Maryland, Inc. offers a one-stop-shop of resources that provide immediate needs for those who are underserved in the community. LifeStyles has requested $200,000 as part of a state bond bill for renovation and capital equipment of the LifeStyles Family Shelter. This site will provide shelter for a maximum of 50 individuals, prioritized for families with dependent children. It will also provide a Homeless Services Center as an expansion to current day center programming for homeless individuals in the community.

Lions Camp Merrick - GRANTED; $60,000 FROM THE SENATE

LIONS Camp Merrick property tracks back to 1939 when the Merrick Family provided a summer camp for hearing impaired children. The camp was later sold to the Archdiocese of Washington to operate the camp. Ownership transitioned to the Waldorf Foundation in 1997 and they are the current owners. The organization has requested $60,000 for the acquisition, planning, design, construction, repair, renovation, reconstruction, site improvement and capital equipping of its facilities, which includes upgrades/repairs to the septic system as well as cabin roofs.

Waldorf Multipurpose Civic Center - GRANTED; $100,000 FROM THE SENATE

In 2013, the Charles County Government completed a Phase One plan for downtown Waldorf, with a civic center in the Waldorf Urban Redevelopment Corridor (WURC) adjacent to the future light rail transit station. This facility would complement the Southern Maryland Rapid Transit (SMRT) Project and be a catalyst for private sector investment as well as jobs growth within walking distance of transit. A request was made for $100,000.

Press media coverage

References

City College of New York alumni
Living people
Democratic Party Maryland state senators
University of the District of Columbia faculty
University of Maryland, College Park alumni
University of Maryland Global Campus faculty
1961 births
21st-century American politicians